The cinnamon-throated woodcreeper (Dendrexetastes rufigula) is a species of bird in the Dendrocolaptinae subfamily of the ovenbird family Furnariidae. It is the only species placed in the genus Dendrexetastes.

It is found in Bolivia, Brazil, Colombia, Ecuador, French Guiana, Guyana, Peru, Suriname, and Venezuela. Its natural habitats are subtropical or tropical moist lowland forests and subtropical or tropical swamps.

The cinnamon-throated woodcreeper is genetically most closely related to the long-billed woodcreeper (Nasica longirostris).

Four subspecies are recognised.

 D. r. devillei (Lafresnaye, 1850) – west Amazonia
 D. r. rufigula (Lesson, RP, 1844) – east Venezuela, the Guianas and north Brazil
 D. r. moniliger Zimmer, JT, 1934 – central west Brazil
 D. r. paraensis Lorenz von Liburnau, L, 1895 – northeast Brazil south of the Amazon

References

cinnamon-throated woodcreeper
Birds of the Amazon Basin
Birds of the Bolivian Amazon
Birds of the Ecuadorian Amazon
Birds of the Peruvian Amazon
Birds of the Guianas
cinnamon-throated woodcreeper
Birds of Brazil
Taxonomy articles created by Polbot